The women's artistic individual all-around gymnastics competition at the 2013 Summer Universiade was held on July 9 at the Gymnastics Centre in Kazan.

Results

External links
2013 Summer Universiade – Artistic gymnastics

Women's artistic individual all-around